is a Japanese actor.

Masana starred as Asao Konishi in L: Change the WorLd.

Filmography

Films
Tales of the Unusual (2000)
I Just Didn't Do It (2004) - Mitsuaki Omori
Happy Flight (2008) - Fukuo Okamoto
Hero (2015) - Shūji Ido
The Tokyo Night Sky Is Always the Densest Shade of Blue (2017)
Talking the Pictures (2019) - Kōkichi
Hotel Royal (2020) - Shinichi Honma
The Cinderella Addiction (2021)

Television
The Kindaichi Case Files (NTV, 1996) - Yonemura
Hero (Fuji TV, 2001) - Shūji Ido
Zeni Geba (NTV, 2009) - Tanabe
A Chef of Nobunaga (TV Asahi, 2013) - Ashikaga Yoshiaki
Ossan's Love: In the Sky (TV Asahi, 2019) - Magosaburo Karasuma
The Way of the Househusband (NTV, 2020) - Miku's Father

References

External links

Japanese male film actors
Japanese male television actors
Living people
People from Kawasaki, Kanagawa
1970 births
20th-century Japanese male actors
21st-century Japanese male actors